Tiit Käbin (12 May 1937 Puka – 5 March 2011) was an Estonian jurist and politician. He was a member of the VII, VIII and IX Riigikogu.

References

1937 births
2011 deaths
Estonian Reform Party politicians
Res Publica Party politicians
Estonian jurists
Members of the Riigikogu, 1992–1995
Members of the Riigikogu, 1995–1999
Members of the Riigikogu, 1999–2003
Voters of the Estonian restoration of Independence
University of Tartu alumni
Academic staff of the University of Tartu
Academic staff of Tallinn University
Recipients of the Order of the National Coat of Arms, 3rd Class
People from Otepää Parish